This is a list of Ronnie James Dio releases. Some of his early appearances on 45 rpm singles are collected on several volumes of the LP series The History of Syracuse Music, released in the 1980s. A complete discography with lyrics can be found here.

Releases

Ronnie & The Red Caps

Ronnie Dio & The Prophets

Singles

Albums

The Electric Elves

The Elves

Singles

Bootlegs

Elf

Studio albums

Compilations

Bootlegs

Rainbow
For more details, see Rainbow discography

Studio albums

Live albums

Black Sabbath
For more details, see Black Sabbath discography.

Studio albums

Live albums

Dio
For more details, see Dio discography.

Studio albums 

Holy Diver (1983) US 2× Platinum UK Silver
The Last in Line (1984) US Platinum UK Silver
Sacred Heart (1985) US Gold
Dream Evil (1987)
Lock up the Wolves (1990)
Strange Highways (1993)
Angry Machines (1996)
Magica (2000)
Killing the Dragon (2002)
Master of the Moon  (2004)

Live albums 

 Intermission (1986)
 Sacred Heart (DVD 1986)
 Inferno: Last in Live (1998)
 We Rock (DVD 2005)
 Evil or Divine – Live in New York City (2005)
 Holy Diver – Live (2006)
 Dio at Donington UK: Live 1983 & 1987 (2010)
 Finding the Sacred Heart – Live in Philly 1986 (2013)
 Live in London, Hammersmith Apollo 1993 (2014)

Compilations 

 Diamonds – The Best of Dio (1992)
 The Very Beast of Dio (2000)
 The Very Beast of Dio Vol. 2 (2012)

Heaven & Hell

Studio albums
 The Devil You Know (2009)

Live albums
 Live from Radio City Music Hall (2007)
 Neon Nights: 30 Years of Heaven & Hell (2010)

Guest appearances
Bobby Comstock & The Counts: "Your Big Brown Eyes" 7" Single (1960), "Run My Heart" 7" Single (1963)
The Angels: My Boyfriend's Back 7" Single (1963), My Boyfriend's Back (1963)
Austin Gravelding: Self Made Man (1970)
Roger Glover: The Butterfly Ball and the Grasshopper's Feast (1974)
David Coverdale: Northwinds (1978)
Kerry Livgren: Seeds of Change (1980), The Best of Kerry Livgren (2002)
Heaven: Where Angels Fear to Tread (1983)
Rough Cutt: LA's Hottest Unsigned Rock Bands (1983), KLOS 95 1/2 Rock to Riches (1983), Rough Cutt (1985), Rough Cutt Live (1996), Anthology (2008)
Hellion: 12 Commandments in Metal (1985), To Hellion and Back (2014) (production only)
Hear 'n Aid: Hear 'n Aid (1986), "Stars" 7"/12" Single (1986), Hear 'n Aid: The Sessions (VHS video) (1986)
Eddie Hardin & Guests: Wizard's Convention (1994)
Dog Eat Dog: Play Games (1996)
Munetaka Higuchi with Dream Castle: Free World (1997)
Pat Boone: In a Metal Mood: No More Mr. Nice Guy (1997)
Various Artists: Humanary Stew: A Tribute to Alice Cooper (1999), Not the Same Old Song and Dance: A Tribute to Aerosmith (1999), We Wish you a Metal Xmas and a Headbanging New Year (2008)
Deep Purple: In Concert with The London Symphony Orchestra (1999), Live at the Rotterdam Ahoy (2001), The Soundboard Series (2001)
Eddie Ojeda: Axes 2 Axes (2005)
Ian Gillan: Gillan's Inn (2006)
Queensrÿche: Operation: Mindcrime II (2006), Mindcrime at the Moore (2007)
Tenacious D: The Pick of Destiny (2006)
Various Artists with Steve Lukather, In Session (2008)
Girlschool: Legacy (2008)
David "Rock" Feinstein: Bitten By the Beast (2010)
The Rods: Vengeance (2011)

Other media 
The Black Sabbath Story (Documentary, Vol. 2) (1992)
Metal: A Headbangers Journey (Documentary) (2005)
Heavy: The Story of Heavy Metal (Documentary) (2006)
Tenacious D in the Pick of Destiny (Film) (2006)
That Metal Show – Season 2, Episode 8: Heaven & Hell (2009)

Studio albums timeline

Additional musician timeline

References

External links 
 

Discographies of American artists
Heavy metal discographies